China Shanghai Shenzhen 300 Stock Index Futures, often abbreviated to "Hushen 300 Index" (Shanghai is commonly abbreviated in Chinese as Hù, and Shenzhen is abbreviated as shēn), designated by the commodity ticker symbol IF, is a stock market index futures contract traded in China Financial Futures Exchange (CFFEX). The notional value of one contract is RMB￥300 (US$1.00 = 6.83 RMB) times the value of the Shanghai Shenzhen 300 Stock Index. It is known to be the first stock index futures contract in China.

It was introduced by the CFFEX on April 16, 2010.

Contract Specifications 

Exchange: China Financial Futures Exchange (CFFEX) 
Type: Index Futures 
Underlying: Hushen 300 Index 
Currency: Renminbi (RMB) 
Contract: Size 300 RMB x Index 
Tick Size: 0.2 
Tick Value: 60 RMB 
Pre-Open 1 
Trading Session 1: 09:15 – 11:30 
Pre-Open 2 
Trading Session 2: 13:00 – 15:15 
Pre-Open T+1 : No T+1 Session 
Trading Session T+1: No T+1 Session 
Last Trading Day: The Third Friday of the Contract Month 
Final Settlement Day: The Third Friday of the Contract Month 
Final Settlement Price 
Settlement Type: Cash 
Contract Months: current month, next-to current month, last month of the next quarter, last month of the second next quarter 
First Trading Day: April 16, 2010 
Position Limit: 10000 long or short position delta limit for all contract
months combined 
Initial Margin (outright): 15% of contract value (18% for far months) 
Daily Price Limit: +/- 10% of previous close 
Index Options: No 
Exchange Symbol: IF 
Notes: RMB 500,000 yuan minimum account size to begin trading.

References

Commodity exchanges in China
Derivatives (finance)